The 1000 Islands History Museum  is a museum in Gananoque, Ontario, Canada, that interprets the history and ecology of Gananoque and the 1000 Islands. It was once the site of a railway.

Starting with an ancient mountain range and continuing to the present day, this Museum tells a story of the cultures and creatures who have lived along the shores of the St. Lawrence River, in and around the Town of Gananoque. The museum also provides travelling exhibits, such as an exhibit on Canadian women in STEM in 2020.

References

External links

Museums in Leeds and Grenville United Counties
History of Leeds and Grenville United Counties
Local museums in Canada